Fist Full Of Bees is the tenth album by the band Bride. It is the band's attempt to make an album within the nu metal genre of the early 2000s. It was the first and last album with Absolute Records, as the singer Dale Thompson stated in an interview in 2003: "Nothing happened and that was the problem. The record company was not answering questions, not moving and had no real plan for the record, so it died. I got us out of the contract by discussing my personal beliefs and philosophies with the head of the label. He and I did not see eye to eye, so he released us." The album was heavily criticized by both Bride fans and reviewers who did not know what to make of the album. The album mixed in rap-core metal which was uniquely different from their entire musical catalog.

Track listing
 "Too Tired" – 2:45
 "White House" - 4:15
 "Beginning of the End" - 4:45
 "Dog The Nine" - 3:50
 "God" - 4:23
 "Bitter End" - 4:11
 "War" - 3:55
 "Never Thought About Going Back" - 3:19
 "Soul Winner" - 4:07
 "Jesus In Me" - 4:15
 "California Sunshine" - 3:06
 "Rollin" - 3:45

Personnel
 Dale Thompson - vocals
 Troy Thompson - guitar
 Michael Loy - drums
 Lawrence Bishop - bass

References

2001 albums
Bride (band) albums
Alternative metal albums by American artists